Richard Chase (1950–1980) was an American cannibalistic serial killer, mass murderer, and necrophile.

Richard Chase may also refer to:

 J. Richard Chase (1930–2010), president of Biola University, and of Wheaton College
 Richard B. Chase, professor of operations management
 Richard Chase (folklorist) (1904–1988), American folklorist
 Richard Chase, poker player in 2006 World Series of Poker results

See also
 Rick Chase (1957–2002), disc jockey